The Brampton Arts Council was a charitable, multi-arts umbrella organization dedicated to the promotion and development of the arts in the city of Brampton in Ontario, Canada. It represented numerous artists and arts groups, the Brampton Arts Council encourages and recognizes excellence in the arts across the community. To fulfill its mandate, the Brampton Arts Council carries out activities in the following categories:

 education and development
 networking opportunities
 communications
 promotion and advocacy

The BAC annually recognizes a Brampton resident for their contribution to the arts.

Arts Person of the Year
Brampton Arts Council Arts Person of the Year is a prize to honour the Brampton resident who exemplifies continued patronage to any sector of the arts: visual, dance, dramatic or musical.

Past winners
2014 - Mike Butterworth
2013 - Chuck Scott
2012 - Jade Jager Clark
2011 - David Rehner
2010 - Kelly McNeil
2009 - Glenn McFarlane
2008 - Dale O'Hara
2007 - Lynden Cowan
2006 - Maureen Adams
2005 - Alan & Sylvia Gibson
2004 - John Cutruzzola
2003 - Paulette Murphy
2002 - Marion Fralick-Bartlett
2001 - David & Catherine Harmsworth
2000 - Rhoda Begley
1999 - Conrad Mieschke
1998 - Peter Richards
1997 - Alan Heatley & John Setterfield
1996 - Jan Stapleton
1995 - Gail & Ken Watson
1994 - Andrew Dittgen
1993 - Joseph Gomes
1992 - Keith Moreau
1991 - Moira Lumley
1990 - L. Greta Capps
1989 - Jack Reid

External links
 Brampton Arts Council

Culture of Brampton